Alex Lane (born 29 August 1995) is a male English badminton player from Kingston, Surrey.

Badminton career
Alex won the singles European Under 17 Junior Gold in 2001. He won his first senior international title at the 2015 Slovak Open in the men's singles event.

Personal life
His mother is Suzanne Louis-Lane, father Richard Lane and brother is Ben Lane.

Achievements

BWF International Challenge/Series 
Men's singles

  BWF International Challenge tournament
  BWF International Series tournament
  BWF Future Series tournament

References

External links 
 
 
 
 

1995 births
Living people
English male badminton players
Sportspeople from Surrey
People from Kingston upon Thames